In telecommunications, extinction ratio (re) is the ratio of two optical power levels of a digital signal generated by an optical source, e.g., a laser diode. The extinction ratio may be expressed as a fraction, in dB, or as a percentage. It may be given by

where P1 is the optical power level generated when the light source is on, and P0 is the power level generated when the light source is off.

The polarization extinction ratio (PER) is the ratio of optical powers of perpendicular polarizations, usually called TE (transverse electric) and TM (transverse magnetic). In telecommunications, the PER is used to characterize the degree of polarization in a polarization-maintaining device or fiber. For coherent transmitter and receiver, the PER is a key parameter, since X polarization and Y polarization are coded with different signals.

References

 
 Material also incorporated from MIL-STD-2196.

Data transmission
Telecommunication theory
Engineering ratios
Laser science